Lado Chachanidze (Vladimeri Chachanidze, born May 14, 2000) is a Georgian rugby player who currently plays for Aviron Bayonnais in France as a lock.

References

Living people
Rugby union players from Georgia (country)
Rugby union locks
2000 births